Hattersley is an English surname, originally given to people from Hattersley, Greater Manchester. Notable people with the surname include:

Camilla Hattersley (born 1995), British swimmer
Giles Hattersley, British journalist
Martin Hattersley (born 1932), Canadian lawyer and politician
Roy Hattersley (born 1932), British politician
Thomas Hattersley (born 1988) American Woodworker

References

English-language surnames
English toponymic surnames